Smoller is a surname. Notable people with this surname include:
Dorothy Smoller ( 1898 – 1926), American actress
Fred Smoller, political science professor who made a video about American politician Steve Rocco
Joel Smoller (1936 – 2017), American mathematician
Jordan Smoller (born 1961), American psychiatric geneticist
Sylvia Wassertheil-Smoller, American epidemiologist and mother of Jordan